The 2018 Connacht Senior Football Championship was the 119th installment of the annual Connacht Senior Football Championship organised by Connacht GAA. It is one of the four provincial competitions of the 2018 All-Ireland Senior Football Championship. Unlike previous seasons, where the Connacht champions earned a place in the quarter-finals, this year's winners advanced to the new "All-Ireland Super 8s".

The draw for the Connacht Championship was made on 19 October 2017. Details on dates for the fixtures were announced on 31 October 2017.

The winners receive the J. J. Nestor Cup, named after J. J. Nestor of Quinaltagh, County Galway. Galway were the winners of the championship, defeating Roscommon in the final.

Teams
The Connacht championship is contested by the five counties in the Irish province of Connacht plus London and New York. Sligo are the only team to come into the new season under a new manager, with Cathal Corey having replaced Niall Carew. In December 2017, Corey appointed Kevin McDonnell as the new Sligo captain. Roscommon and Galway likewise come into the competition under new captains. Kevin McStay appointed Conor Devaney in place of Ciaráin Murtagh during the winter break, while Damien Comer was named as the new Tribesmen skipper for their league campaign, replacing Gary O'Donnell. New York named Tom Cunniffe, a former All-Ireland finalist with Mayo, as their captain.

Bracket

Fixtures

Quarter-finals

Semi-finals

Final

See also
 2018 All-Ireland Senior Football Championship
 2018 Leinster Senior Football Championship
 2018 Munster Senior Football Championship
 2018 Ulster Senior Football Championship

References

External links
 Connacht GAA website

2C
Connacht Senior Football Championship